Charles Edward Gettins (1883–1925) was an English footballer who played in the Football League for Gainsborough Trinity, Glossop, Middlesbrough and Stockport County.

References

1883 births
1925 deaths
English footballers
Association football forwards
English Football League players
Gainsborough Trinity F.C. players
Middlesbrough F.C. players
Reading F.C. players
Glossop North End A.F.C. players
Stockport County F.C. players
Haslingden F.C. players